Forks of Salmon is an unincorporated community of Siskiyou County in northern California, USA. The town is situated at the confluence of the north and south forks of the Salmon River, hence its name. The ZIP Code is 96031. The community is inside area code 530.

History
Forks of Salmon was originally a California Gold Rush settlement in the now defunct Klamath County, California.  It has had its own post office from September 30, 1858, until today, with a short break from October 16, 1871, to August 28, 1872.

Politics

See also

References

Settlements formerly in Klamath County, California
Unincorporated communities in California
Unincorporated communities in Siskiyou County, California